The LaSalle Blue Sox were a minor league baseball franchise based in LaSalle, Illinois and LaSalle County, Illinois in 1914. The LaSalle Blue Sox played as members of the Class D level Illinois-Missouri League, which folded after the 1914 season.

History 
The 1914 LaSalle Blue Sox began minor league baseball play as members of the six–team Class D level Illinois–Missouri League. The Champaign-Urbana Velvets, Kankakee Kanks, Lincoln Abes, Ottawa Indians and Streator Boosters joined LaSalle in beginning league play on May 13, 1914.

The LaSalle Blue Sox finished in fourth place in 1914, as the Illinois–Missouri league lost two teams during the season. On July 3, 1914, the Lincoln Abes had a record of 32–15 and were in first 1st place when they disbanded along with the Kankakee Kanks. The Champaign Velvets eventually captured the 1914 championship, with LaSalle finishing last among the remaining four teams, when the season ended on August 9, 1914. The LaSalle Blue Sox franchise completed the season with a record of 26-60, playing under managers Anthony Hinley and LaSalle native John Fitzpatrick. 

The final standings were led by the Champaign–Urbana Velvets, who finished with a 62–27 record, followed by the Ottawa Indians (47–38), Streator Boosters (40–48) and La Salle Blue Sox (26–60). As the Lincoln Abes (32–15) and Kankakee Kanks (14–33) had folded, they were not counted in the final standings. The Illinois–Missouri League permanently folded after the 1914 season.

LaSalle, Illinois has not hosted another minor league team.

The ballpark
The name of the home minor league ballpark for the LaSalle Blue Sox is not directly referenced.

Year-by-year records

Notable alumni

John Fitzpatrick (1914, MGR)
Bill Ludwig (1914)

See also
LaSalle Blue Sox players

References

External links
LaSalle - Baseball Reference

Defunct minor league baseball teams
Professional baseball teams in Illinois
Defunct baseball teams in Illinois
Baseball teams established in 1914
Baseball teams disestablished in 1914
Illinois-Missouri League teams
LaSalle County, Illinois